Zülfiye Gündoğdu (born December 30, 1982 in Ankara) is a Turkish volleyball player. She is 174 cm and plays as setter. She plays for Beşiktaş. She signed with the team on 5 July 2011. She has also played for Ankara Karayolları, İller Bankası, Ankara TED Koleji, Gazi Üniversitesi, Yalovaspor, Polisan Değirmendere, Nilüfer Belediyesi, Fenerbahçe Acıbadem and she played 20 times for Turkish Women's Beach Volley Team.

Awards

Clubs
 2010 Turkish Super Cup -  Champion, with Fenerbahçe Acıbadem
 2010 FIVB World Club Championship -  Champion, with Fenerbahçe Acıbadem
 2010-11 CEV Champions League -  Bronze medal, with Fenerbahçe Acıbadem
 2010-11 Aroma Women's Volleyball League -  Champion, with Fenerbahçe Acıbadem

See also
 Turkish women in sports

References

1982 births
Living people
Sportspeople from Ankara
Turkish women's volleyball players
İller Bankası volleyballers
Beşiktaş volleyballers
Fenerbahçe volleyballers